Jawahar Navodaya Vidyalaya, Rayagada (JNVR) is a co-educational boarding school located at Burujuguda, Therubali in the district of Rayagada, Odisha India.

History
Jawahar Navodaya Vidyalaya in the district of Rayagada has been founded by the  Ministry of Human Resources Development at Bissam Cuttack in 2002. The Vidyalaya is run by Navodaya Vidyalaya Samiti. The school started at a temporary site within Bissam Cuttack about 50 km  away from the district Headquarters.

Objectives
Pragyanam Brahma is the motto of the vidyalaya.

The aim of Vidyalaya is to impart quality education to rural talented Children of district Rayagada, Odisha to meet the new challenges of Competitive era. It is a mission to promote national integration through migration of students from Hindi to Non-Hindi speaking states and vice versa.

About Jawahar Navodaya vidyalaya
First established in 1985, they are the brain child of the then human resources minister, P. V. Narasimha Rao (who later became Prime Minister of India) to find and foster talented children from the rural parts of India. they were formerly named as navodaya vidyalayas and renamed later as "Jawahar Navodaya Vidyalaya"s in the birth-centenary year of Jawahar Lal Nehru, the first prime minister of independent India. They offer free education to all students who get selected through the admission process which includes an all India entrance exam, held at district level.

References

External links
 NVS Official Website

Jawahar Navodaya Vidyalayas in Odisha
Schools in Odisha
Education in Rayagada district
Educational institutions established in 2002
2002 establishments in Orissa